Hoenkoop is a hamlet in the Dutch province of Utrecht.

Since 1970, Hoenkoop has been a part of the municipality of Oudewater. Between 1815 and 1970, it was a separate municipality.

The hamlet was first mentioned in 1299 or 1300 Hoencoop, and means "(peat) concession", however the name first name Hoen does not fit. Hoenkoop has not place name signs. In 1840, it was home to 324 people.

Gallery

References 

Former municipalities of Utrecht (province)
Oudewater